Liam Doyle (born 1969 in Bodyke, County Clare) is an Irish former sportsperson. He played hurling with his local club Bodyke and with the Clare senior inter-county team in the 1990s and 2000s. He played wing-back in Clare's All-Ireland winning teams of 1995 and 1997, winning an All Star award in both years.

Doyle served as trainer of Sixmilebridge Hurling club in 2007 and 2008. He also acted as a selector for the Clare senior team from 2009 to 2011 under the management of Ger O'Loughlin.

References 

1969 births
Living people
Clare inter-county hurlers
Bodyke hurlers
All-Ireland Senior Hurling Championship winners